Ghos Bakhsh Khan Mahar (born 27 October 1945) is a Pakistani politician who has been a member of the National Assembly of Pakistan, since August 2018. Previously he was a member of the National Assembly from 2002 to May 2018.

Early life
He was born on 27 October 1945.

Political career

He was a member of the Provincial Assembly of Sindh from Constituency PS-7 (Sukkur) from March 1977 to July 1977.

He was elected to the National Assembly of Pakistan as a candidate of Pakistan Muslim League (Q) (PML-Q) from Constituency NA-203 (Shikarpur-II) in 2002 Pakistani general election. He received 61,432 votes and defeated Agha Arsalan Khan, a candidate of Pakistan Peoples Party (PPP). In the same election, he was re-elected to the Provincial Assembly of Sindh as a candidate of PML-Q from Constituency PS-10 (Shikarpur -II). He received 38,321 votes and defeated Shabir Khan Mahar, a candidate of PPP.

He was re-elected to the National Assembly as a candidate of PML-Q from Constituency NA-203 (Shikarpur-cum-Sukkur-cum-Larkana) in 2008 Pakistani general election. He received 89,921 votes and defeated Sardar Wahid Bux Bhayo, a candidate of PPP.

He was re-elected to the National Assembly as a candidate of Pakistan Muslim League (F) (PML-F) from Constituency NA-203 (Shikarpur-cum-Sukkur-cum-Larkana) in 2013 Pakistani general election. He received 77,065 votes and defeated Sardar Wahid Bux Bhayo, a candidate of PPP.

He was re-elected to the National Assembly as a candidate of Grand Democratic Alliance (GDA) from Constituency NA-199 (Shikarpur-II) in 2018 Pakistani general election.

References

Living people
Saraiki people
Pakistani MNAs 2013–2018
People from Sindh
1945 births
Pakistani MNAs 2008–2013
Pakistani MNAs 2002–2007
Sindh MPAs 1977
Pakistani MNAs 2018–2023
Grand Democratic Alliance MNAs